Janice Murray (born 26 October 1966) is an English former international footballer. She played as a left winger for clubs including Leasowe Pacific, Doncaster Belles and Liverpool Ladies. Murray won around thirty caps for the senior England women's national football team.

Club career
Murray acquired the nickname Psycho. During a match on her native Merseyside, she scored a free kick in a manner which a spectator likened to Zico. The comment, made in scouse, was misheard as Psycho and the name remained with Murray throughout her career. In April 1993 football journalist Henry Winter wrote in The Independent that Murray was "nicknamed 'Psycho' but the possessor of skills more Finney than Vinnie."

She helped Leasowe win the 1989 WFA Cup then won two doubles with Doncaster Belles in 1992 and 1994. Murray returned to Merseyside with newly formed Liverpool Ladies in 1994.

International career
On 23 May 1989, 22-year-old Murray made a debut England appearance in a 2–0 home friendly defeat by Sweden. The match was held at Wembley Stadium to mark the 20th anniversary of the Women's Football Association (WFA) and was played as a curtain raiser to the male national team's Rous Cup game against Chile.

When The Football Association (FA) took over running the national team in 1993, Murray started the first game that September, a 10–0 win over Slovenia in Ljubljana. Manager Ted Copeland selected Murray in the next three 1995 UEFA Women's Championship qualifiers, before she retired from international duty along with club teammate Tracey Davidson. Davidson remarked that: "The management leave a lot to be desired, and if you don't enjoy it, what's the point?"

Murray's subsequent absence from England's 1995 FIFA Women's World Cup squad was controversial. Doncaster Belles manager Paul Edmunds described it as a disaster for the team: "It's such a shame she's not going to Sweden. She'd go down the line, she'd pop in the cross, Kaz'd score on the end of it – she'd solve his [Copeland's] left-side problem in one go. But he's put her off, hasn't he? Disaster, that."

References

General references

 

1966 births
Living people
English women's footballers
Everton F.C. (women) players
Doncaster Rovers Belles L.F.C. players
Liverpool F.C. Women players
England women's international footballers
FA Women's National League players
Women's association football wingers